A random dungeon is a dungeon in a role-playing video game which is procedurally generated by the computer using an algorithm, such that the dungeon is laid out differently every time the player enters it, and a player often never plays through quite the same dungeon twice, as there are innumerable possibilities for how they generate.  

Random dungeons are usually found in the Action RPG genre of games. Programs are also available that generate random dungeons for tabletop role-playing games. 

Random dungeons first appeared in the ASCII adventure game Rogue, then in other "roguelikes", combining the kinds of maze-like dungeons found in the role-playing game Dungeons & Dragons with a computer's ability to generate mazes on the fly. Random dungeons have followed video game technology through the advent of 2D and subsequently 3D graphics, although they still often rely on most of the same basic algorithms that were used when they used ASCII graphics.

See also
Hack and slash
Dungeon crawl
Procedural generation

References

Video game gameplay